John Lachs is Centennial Professor of Philosophy at Vanderbilt University, where he has taught since 1967. Lachs received his Ph.D. from Yale University in 1961. His primary focus is on American philosophy (he has written a book and several articles on George Santayana) and German Idealism.

Biography 
John Lachs was born in Budapest, Hungary, on July 17, 1934. He emigrated to Canada as a child, and he received his B.A. and M.A. from McGill University in 1956 and 1957. At Yale University, he wrote a dissertation on the philosophy of George Santayana, graduating in 1961. He has been a member of the Vanderbilt University faculty since 1967 and has written a number of books and many articles over this period and before.  He served as president of the Metaphysical Society of America in 1997. He is recognized as an outstanding teacher at Vanderbilt faculty, receiving the Graduate Teaching Award in 2000, the Outstanding Commitment to Teaching Freshmen Award in 1999 and the Madison Sarratt Prize for Excellence in Undergraduate Teaching in 1972.  His style is highly accessible as Lachs is committed to making philosophical questions and their discussion come within the grasp of all his audiences. Lachs is a pragmatist in the tradition of William James and Josiah Royce. He was president of the William James Society in 2007.

Lachs is the faculty adviser of Young Americans for Liberty at Vanderbilt University and is a libertarian. Among the prominent alumni whose Ph.D. dissertations he has advised are many of the leading figures in bioethics, pragmatism, and a number of public intellectuals, including Glenn McGee, Ph.D., Paul Menzel, Ph.D., Herman Saatkamp, Ph.D.,  On April 3, 2013, he became one of three professors in Vanderbilt's history to receive the prestigious Alumni Education Award twice.

He is a member of the Editorial Advisory Board for Public Philosophy Journal.

Research area 
His philosophical interests center on human nature. This takes him into metaphysics, philosophy of mind, political philosophy, and ethics. He has continuing research interests in American philosophy and in German Idealism, along with research and teaching interests in medical and business ethics.

Lachs is general editor of the Encyclopedia of American Philosophy. An issue of The Journal of Speculative Philosophy will be devoted to his essay "Both Better Off and Better: Moral Progress Amid Continuing Carnage," with responses from a half dozen philosophers.

He is also chair of the American Philosophical Association's Centennial Committee, charged with celebrating the private value and social usefulness of philosophy. Plans are being made for activities throughout the country, ranging from radio programs to book signings and coffee house conversations, designed to show the relevance of philosophy to life.

Publications 

A recipient of the Herbert Schneider Award for Lifetime Contributions to American Philosophy in 1997, Lachs is also the author of the following books, among others:
 Intermediate Man. Hackett Publishers, Indianapolis, 1981, paperback 1983.
 Mind and Philosophers. Vanderbilt University Press, 1987.
 The Relevance of Philosophy to Life, Vanderbilt University Press, 1995.
 In Love with Life, Vanderbilt University Press, 1998.
 Thinking in the Ruins: Wittgenstein and Santayana. Vanderbilt University Press, 2000.
 A Community of Individuals. Routledge, 2003.
 The Philosophy of William Ernest Hocking (ed. with Micah Hester), Vanderbilt University Press 2001.
 "Human Natures," Proceedings of the American Philosophical Association, 1990.
 "Stoic Pragmatism", Indiana University Press, 2012.
 Meddling: On the Virtue of Leaving Others Alone, Indiana University Press, 2014.

References

Further reading 
Krzysztof Piotr Skowroński, 2023.  La filosofía del pragmatismo estoico y sus ambiciones culturales, La Torre del Virrey: Revista de estudios culturales, num. 33.
Krzysztof Piotr Skowroński, 2022.  Cultural Diversity and Clashing Narratives about National Culture: A Central European Stoic Pragmatist Perspective, Ethics&Bioethics (in Central Europe), vol. 12 (issue 3-4, December), pp. 212-220.
Krzysztof Piotr Skowroński, 2021.  Stoic Pragmatist Ethics in the Time of Pandemic, Ethics&Bioethics (in Central Europe), vol. 11 (issue 1-2, June), pp. 82-91.
Krzysztof Piotr Skowroński, 2020. " Santayana as a Stoic Pragmatist in John Lachs's Interpretation", Overheard in Seville: Bulletin of the George Santayana Society, no. 38, pp. 109-122.
Krzysztof Piotr Skowroński, ed., 2018.  John Lachs's Practical Philosophy, Brill.

External links
 Faculty Page at Vanderbilt
 Sewanee Lily Fellows
 Berlin Practical Philosophy International Forum e.V.

Year of birth missing (living people)
Living people
Yale University alumni
Vanderbilt University faculty
Presidents of the Metaphysical Society of America
American libertarians
Continental philosophers